Conflans-sur-Anille is a commune in the Sarthe department in the Pays de la Loire region in north-western France.

The nearby Chateau De La Barre is the seat of the Comte de Vanssay.

Famous residents 
 Alphonse Louis Poitevin, photographer and photographic process technologist

See also 
 Communes of the Sarthe department

References 

Communes of Sarthe